Tonb-e Bongeru (also Romanized as Tonb-e Bongerū; also known as Tomb-e Bongerū) is a village in Dezhgan Rural District, in the Central District of Bandar Lengeh County, Hormozgan Province, Iran. At the 2006 census, its population was 241, in 50 families.

References 

Populated places in Bandar Lengeh County